...And Mother Makes Five is a British sitcom that aired on ITV from 1 May 1974 to 11 February 1976. Starring Wendy Craig, it is the sequel of ...And Mother Makes Three and aired for four series. It was written by Richard Waring, Brian Cooke and Johnnie Mortimer. Craig also wrote thirteen of the episodes under the pseudonym Jonathan Marr, including the whole of series two. It was made for the ITV network by Thames Television.

Background
This sitcom was the follow-up to ...And Mother Makes Three, which had finished in June 1973. The final series had seen Sally Harrison, a widowed mother of two sons, marrying the antique bookseller, David Redway, the divorced father of one daughter.  The two families then became one. The two sitcoms had almost exactly the same cast, although Miriam Mann had been replaced by Maxine Gordon in the role of Jane Redway.

Cast
Wendy Craig - Sally Redway (formerly Harrison)
Richard Coleman - David Redway
Robin Davies - Simon Redway (formerly Harrison)
David Parfitt - Peter Redway (formerly Harrison)
Maxine Gordon - Jane Redway
Valerie Lush - Auntie Flo
Charlotte Mitchell - Monica Spicer
Tony Britton - Joss Spicer
Patricia Routledge - Mrs Fletcher

Plot
...And Mother Makes Five is similar to ...And Mother Makes Three with domestic problems being the centre of the programme. The children are now older, but as troublesome as before. There are new characters in the form of Joss and Monica Spicer, and Mrs Fletcher.

Episodes

Series One (1974)
"Where Our Caravan Is Resting" (1 May 1974)
"The Matter of Tiny Feet" (8 May 1974)
"Seed of Suspicion" (15 May 1974)
"To the Aid of the Party" (22 May 1974)
"Wish You Were There" (29 May 1974)
"If I Can Help Somebody" (5 June 1974)
"Fair Exchange" (12 June 1974)

Series Two (1974)
"Love's Labours Lost" (22 October 1974)
"Double Standards" (29 October 1974)
"Bridging the Gap" (5 November 1974)
"For Richer For Poorer" (12 November 1974)
"Date Data" (19 November 1974)
"Part of the Furniture" (26 November 1974)

Series Three (1975)
"Growing Pains" (4 June 1975)
"Goodbye Mr Turnbull" (11 June 1975)
"Friends and Neighbours" (18 June 1975)
"The Mating Test" (25 June 1975)
"Legs Eleven" (2 July 1975)
"Art For Art's Sake" (9 July 1975)
"Health Through Joy" (16 July 1975)

Series Four (1976)
"Words and Pictures" (7 January 1976)
"None So Blind" (14 January 1976)
"Love Is A Most Confounded Thing" (21 January 1976)
"Unlicenced Premises" (28 January 1976)
"Sally's Diary" (4 February 1976)
"Jobs for the Boy" (11 February 1976)

DVD releases

External links
...And Mother Makes Five at Nostalgia Central

References

 Mark Lewisohn, "Radio Times Guide to TV Comedy", BBC Worldwide Ltd, 2003
 ...And Mother Makes Five at British TV Comedy

1970s British sitcoms
1974 British television series debuts
1976 British television series endings
ITV sitcoms
Television series by Fremantle (company)
Television shows produced by Thames Television
English-language television shows
Television shows shot at Teddington Studios